Miranda Chih-Ning Cheng (Chinese: 程之寧; born 6 June 1979, Taipei) is a Taiwanese-born and Dutch-educated mathematician and theoretical physicist who works as an assistant professor at the University of Amsterdam. She is known for formulating the umbral moonshine conjectures and for her work on the connections between K3 surfaces and string theory.

Early life
Cheng grew up in Taiwan, where she was first interested in literature. At around twelve years old, she was interested in music, including pop music, rock, and punk. Because the material at  her school was too easy, she skipped two years and got moved to a special class. The  competitiveness and stress that came from school caused her to drop out and leave her parents' home to work at a record store and play in a punk rock band at the age of 16. Despite not completing high school, she was able to enter university through a program for gifted science students that she had gone through.

Education 
After graduating from the Department of Physics at National Taiwan University in 2001, she moved to the Netherlands to continue her studies, and earned a master's degree in theoretical physics in 2003 from Utrecht University, under the supervision of Nobel laureate Gerard 't Hooft. She completed her Ph.D. in 2008 from the University of Amsterdam under the joint supervision of Erik Verlinde and Kostas Skenderis. After postdoctoral study at Harvard University and working as a researcher at CNRS, she returned to Amsterdam in 2014, with a joint position in the Institute of Physics and Korteweg-de Vries Institute for Mathematics.

Work with the Umbral Moonshine Conjecture 
Cheng, along with John Duncan of Case Western Reserve University and Jeffrey Harvey of the University of Chicago, formulated the Umbral Moonshine Conjecture in 2012, providing evidence of 23 new moonshines. They postulated that for each of these moonshines, there is a string theory, in which the string states are counted by the mock modular forms and the finite group captures the model's symmetry. In reference to the string theory underlying umbral moonshine, Cheng said that “it suggests that there’s a special symmetry acting on the physical theory of K3 surfaces.”

References

External links
Home page

1979 births
Living people
21st-century Dutch mathematicians
21st-century Dutch women
Dutch women mathematicians
21st-century Dutch physicists
Dutch women physicists
Scientists from Taipei
Utrecht University alumni
University of Amsterdam alumni
Academic staff of the University of Amsterdam
Taiwanese emigrants to the Netherlands
21st-century women mathematicians